Music in the Air is a Canadian music television series which aired on CBC Television in 1982.

Premise
This series of symphony orchestra recitals was recorded with live audiences in various Canadian cities, in studios and auditoriums.

Scheduling
This hour-long series was broadcast Sundays at 10:00 p.m. (Eastern) from 4 July to 5 September 1982.

Episodes
 Atlantic Symphony Orchestra - featuring Gary Karr (double bass) and Philippe Djokic (violin); produced through CBC Halifax
 Atlantic Symphony Orchestra - featuring Édith Butler (vocalist) and John Neville (actor); produced through CBC Halifax
 Victoria Symphony - featuring Katja Cervosek; produced in Vancouver
 Kitchener-Waterloo Symphony - two episodes, one of which featured Anton Kuerti
 Hamilton Philharmonic Orchestra - two episodes which featured the Elmer Iseler Singers
 Edmonton Symphony Orchestra - two episodes, observing its 30th anniversary, one episode of which featured James Campbell (clarinet)

References

External links
 

CBC Television original programming
1982 Canadian television series debuts
1982 Canadian television series endings
1980s Canadian music television series